Nicolás Aguirre may refer to:

 Nicolás Aguirre (basketball) (born 1988), Argentine basketball player
 Nicolás Aguirre (footballer) (born 1990), Argentine footballer